John Wayne Harold "Jack" Foley (born August 9, 1940) is an American poet and radio personality, living in Oakland, California.

Biography
John Wayne Harold Foley was born in Neptune, New Jersey, raised in Port Chester, New York, and educated at Cornell University and the University of California-Berkeley. His career as a poet is unique because it has always involved performance, specifically the presentation of “multivoiced” pieces written by Foley but performed by both Foley and his late wife, Adelle Joan Foley (1940-2016). These pieces often feature conflicting, simultaneous voices whose interrelationships reflect Foley’s often-stated belief that “some parts of the mind don’t know what other parts are doing.”

Foley met Adelle in November, 1960 while he was attending Cornell and she was attending Goucher College in Maryland. They married on December 21, 1961; the couple had one child, Sean (born 1974). The Foleys moved to California in 1963 so that he could attend UC-Berkeley and she could work at the Federal Reserve Bank of San Francisco. Foley received an MA in English Literature at UC Berkeley and published several poems and articles, but by 1974, influenced by Charles Olson's Maximus Poems, he had dropped out of graduate school to pursue a career as a poet and writer. His first poetry reading, in which he read jointly with Adelle, was in June 1985. Since 1987, he has published 15 books of poetry, 5 books of criticism, a book of stories, and a two-volume “chronoencyclopedia,” Visions & Affiliations: California Poetry 1940-2005.

In 2010, he received a Lifetime Achievement Award from the Berkeley Poetry Festival, and June 5, 2010 was designated Jack Foley Day in Berkeley, California. In 2018 he became the recipient of the Albert Nelson Marquis Lifetime Achievement Award. His poetry books often include accompanying CDs or cassette tapes on which Foley and Adelle perform his work. After Adelle's death in 2016 Foley has found a new love and performance partner in Sangye Land, daughter of poet Julie Rogers and stepdaughter of poet David Meltzer. Since 1988, he has hosted a show of interviews and poetry presentations on Berkeley radio station, KPFA.

In 2019, Monongahela Books released Foley’s Unmanageable Masterpiece, edited by Dana Gioia and Peter Whitfield. The book discusses and celebrates Foley’s Visions & Affiliations: “Some...considered the elaborate time-line the first adequate account of California’s complex and contradictory literary life. Others recognized Foley’s radical innovation in changing how literary history could be written. A few even considered these strange and sprawling yet compulsively readable tomes an oddball masterpiece.”

Works
Letters/Lights – Words for Adelle (Mother's Hen, 1987)
Gershwin - Poems (Norton Coker Press, 1991)
Adrift (Pantograph Press,1993)
Exiles (Pantograph Press, 1996)
Dead/Requiem,with Ivan Arguelles (Pantograph Press,1998) 
Saint James: An Homage to James Joyce, with Ivan Arguelles (Pantograph Press,1998)
Foley's Books – California Rebels, Beats & Radicals (Pantograph Press, 2000)
O Powerful Western Star – Poetry & Art in California (Pantograph Press, 2000)
Some Songs by Georges Brassens (Goldfish Press, 2001)
 The "Fallen Western Star" Wars: A Debate About Literary California, editor (Scarlet Tanager Books, 2001)
Greatest Hits 1974-2003 (Pudding House Press, 2004)
Fennel in the Rain, with Adelle Foley (Small Change Series, WordTemple Press, 2007)
The Dancer & the Dance: A Book of Distinctions, foreword by Al Young(Red Hen Press, 2008)
Visions & Affiliations: A California Literary Time Line, Poets & Poetry,2 volumes (Pantograph Press, 2011, Part I , Part II )
Sketches Poetical (2012, artist’s book with CD, a collaboration with Helen Breger; art by Breger, poetry by Foley). Designed by Paul Veres. No ISBN number.
Eyes: Selected Poems (Poetry Hotel Press, 2013), introduction by Ivan Argüelles, 
Life: Poems by Jack Foley (Word Palace Press, 2014), chapbook, 
A California Beat Literary Timeline—The 1950s (The Beat Scene Press, England, 2014), a reprint of the 1950s section from Visions & Affiliations
RIVERRUN: (Poetry Hotel Press, 2016), poetry, 
The Tiger & Other Tales (Sagging Meniscus Press, 2016), stories, prose sketches, plays,  (paperback),  (ebook)
Grief Songs (Sagging Meniscus Press, 2017), poetry dealing with the aftermath of the death in 2016 of Jack's wife Adelle (paperback), 
When Sleep Comes: Shillelagh Songs (Sagging Meniscus Press, 2019), poetry (paperback),

References

External links
Alsop Review Columns
Alsop Review Foley's Books
Dana Gioia Essay, O Powerful Western Star
The Tower Journal, Fall 2012, vol. 5, no. 1, is a web festschrift—a celebration of Foley's life and work.

American translators
American male poets
American spoken word artists
American radio personalities
American essayists
Writers from New York (state)
Writers from San Francisco
People from Port Chester, New York
1940 births
Living people
American male essayists